Eric "EJ" Jackson (born March 3, 1964 in Warren, Ohio) is a world-champion freestyle kayaker, kayak designer, slalom kayaker, founder of Jackson Kayak, and a Professional Bass Tournament angler on the FLW Tour.

Career
Jackson has been world freestyle champion four times (1993, 2001, 2005, 2007), as well as Pre-World Champion in 2000 and 2004 and World Cup Champion in 2006.  In October 2009, Eric Jackson achieved second place at the freestyle kayak world championships in Thun, Switzerland. In 2014 Eric achieved what might be a world record by maintaining his status on the USA Kayak Team for 25 years straight. In 2015 he failed to make the USA Team, but in 2017 he re-qualified and is now on his 27th year on Team USA in total. Eric has been a member of the United States of America Kayaking Team, either in freestyle or in slalom, every year since 1989. Jackson competed in the 1992 Summer Olympics in Barcelona as part of the U.S. Olympic team, finishing 13th in the K1 event.[1] He is a two-time winner of the Everest award.[2] He is the author of 4 instructional books and 8 videos teaching many aspects of whitewater kayaking, including river running, playboating, rolling and bracing. His children Emily and Dane are also World Champion kayakers.

Eric has been noted for his ability to continue to win championships and other major events competing against much younger athletes.[2][3]. 
After spending many years designing kayaks for various manufacturers, Eric founded Jackson Kayak in October 2003.[1].

Since then, Jackson Kayak has grown to the number one position (2007) in whitewater kayaks and is still the best selling brand world-wide today (2018).

Eric is also a competitive fisherman fishing the FLW Bass Tour (big leagues), and kayak fishing tournaments. He recently wrote the rules for the first ever USA Kayak Fishing Team and is helping to organize the first Pan Am and World Kayak Fishing Championships under USA Bass Federation.

Awards and Accolades

International Whitewater Hall of Fame Inductee as a “Champion"- 2008
World Paddle Awards Winner:   Lifetime achievement category. 2015
Everest Awards Winner:   2006 and 2007 as a Champion
Inducted into the International Hall of Fame for Kayaking, Biking, and Rowing at the Childrens’ Museum in Utica, NY- 2006.
Jackson Kayak received the Governor’s Award for Trade Excellence in 2016 for exporting from Governor Haslam of TN.

 
</ref> He is a two-time winner of the Everest award.  He is the author of several instructional books and videos teaching many aspects of whitewater kayaking, including river running, playboating, rolling and bracing.  His children Emily and Dane are also competitive kayakers.

Eric has been noted for his ability to continue to win championships competing against much younger athletes.

After spending many years designing kayaks for various manufacturers, Eric founded Jackson Kayak in October 2003.

Books by Eric Jackson
 Whitewater Paddling: Strokes & Concepts  (1999), 
 Playboating: Kayak With Eric Jackson  (2000), 
Kayaking with Eric Jackson:  Rolling and Bracing https://rowman.com/ISBN/9780811763974/Kayaking-with-Eric-Jackson-Rolling-and-Bracing 
Kayaking with Eric Jackson:  Strokes and Concepts second edition https://www.amazon.com/Kayaking-Eric-Jackson-Strokes-Concepts/dp/0811718352/ref=pd_lpo_sbs_14_t_2?_encoding=UTF8&psc=1&refRID=6ZX3HX5KAD2552VG5CBK

DVDs by Eric Jackson
 Kayaking with Eric Jackson: strokes, concepts and bombproofing your roll
 Rolling and Bracing
 River Running: Basics
 River Running: Advanced
 Playboating: Basics
 Playboating: Advanced
"Pro Freestyle- 2013"
"Expert Freestyle-2013"

References

 Kayaking with Eric Jackson:  Rolling and Bracing https://rowman.com/ISBN/9780811763974/Kayaking-with-Eric-Jackson-Rolling-and-Bracing 
 Kayaking with Eric Jackson:  Strokes and Concepts second editionhttps://www.amazon.com/Kayaking-Eric-Jackson-Strokes-Concepts/dp/0811718352/ref=pd_lpo_sbs_14_t_2?_encoding=UTF8&psc=1&refRID=6ZX3HX5KAD2552VG5CBK

External links
 Eric Jackson Bio at Jackson Kayak
 Best Fishing Kayak
 Eric Jackson Official

1964 births
American male canoeists
Canoeists at the 1992 Summer Olympics
Living people
Whitewater sports people
Kayakers
International whitewater paddlers
Olympic canoeists of the United States